Rushan Rafikov (born 15 May 1995) is a Russian ice hockey player of Tatar descent. He is currently playing with Lokomotiv Yaroslavl of the Kontinental Hockey League. Rafikov was selected by the Calgary Flames in the seventh round (187th overall) of the 2013 NHL Entry Draft.

Rafikov made his Kontinental Hockey League debut during the 2015–16 KHL season.

Career statistics

Regular season and playoffs

International

References

External links

1995 births
Living people
Volga Tatars
Tatar people of Russia
Tatar sportspeople
Admiral Vladivostok players
Calgary Flames draft picks
Lokomotiv Yaroslavl players
Russian ice hockey defencemen
HC Ryazan players
Universiade medalists in ice hockey
Universiade gold medalists for Russia
Competitors at the 2015 Winter Universiade